The Poisoned Stream is a 1921 German silent drama film directed by Urban Gad and starring Wilhelm Diegelmann and Carl de Vogt.

The film's sets were designed by the art director Robert A. Dietrich.

Cast

References

Bibliography

External links

1921 films
Films of the Weimar Republic
Films directed by Urban Gad
German silent feature films
1921 drama films
German drama films
Terra Film films
German black-and-white films
Silent drama films
1920s German films